Philip Stuart Brady  (born 16 June 1939) is an Australian media personality, radio and television identity and voiceover artist born and raised in Kew, Victoria. Apart from a brief period in the 1970s when he worked for a Victorian travel agent, Brady has been employed in the media all his adult life. In 2018, he celebrated 60 years in the industry.

Television
Born on 16 June 1939, to Wilfred Brady, a psychiatrist and composer, Brady became involved in television in the very early days, just two years after its start in Australia. He left school at the age of 18 and started working at Channel Nine in 1958 firstly as a booth announcer (voice-overs).

Brady appeared with Graham Kennedy on In Melbourne Tonight in commercials and comedy sketches as well as compering the show on occasions. He occasionally appeared on The Tarax Show as Prince Philip. He stayed at Channel 9 until 1971 when he was one of many to lose their job when Nine cancelled its variety shows.

In the 1960s and 1970s Brady hosted many television shows including Concentration and Everybody's Talking for the Nine Network and Moneymakers, Junior Moneymakers, Casino Ten, Get the Message  and Password for the 0–10 Network.

Brady made guest appearances on television in the 1990s with a regular nostalgia segment on Good Morning Australia with Bert Newton as well as guest appearances on Seven's Tonight Live with Steve Vizard and ABC's The Late Show.

Radio
Brady hosted shows on radio 3AK at various times during the 1960s and 1980s and also did shifts on radio 3AW in the 1970s.

He worked as producer for Bert Newton's morning show on radio 3UZ in the early 1980s.

In 1986, Brady moved to the Gold Coast and for nearly five years hosted a daytime radio show on Easy Listening 97 Tweed Heads.

Brady came back to Melbourne in 1990 and began a long-lasting partnership with Bruce Mansfield on talkback radio 3AW. Initially they presented the Sunday night nostalgia program Remember When and some months later the duo took over the weeknight show Nightline as well.

Newspaper column
In the 1980s Brady wrote a weekly column in the show business newspaper TV Scene.

Awards
In 2003, Brady, with on-air partner, Bruce Mansfield, won the Australian Commercial Radio Award for Best Networked Program (Nightline). In 2018 Brady was awarded the Medal of the Order of Australia for services to the broadcasting industry.

Community work
Philip is a member of the Patrons Council of the Epilepsy Foundation of Victoria and an Australia Day Ambassador.

Further reading
Remembering when: Philip Brady’s brilliant career by Sarah Patterson.

References

Radio personalities from Melbourne
3AW presenters
Australian television personalities
Living people
People educated at Xavier College
1939 births
Recipients of the Medal of the Order of Australia
Television personalities from Melbourne
People from Kew, Victoria